Urozelotes is a genus of ground spiders that was first described by Cândido Firmino de Mello-Leitão in 1938.

Species
 it contains five species:
Urozelotes kabenge FitzPatrick, 2005 – Zambia
Urozelotes mysticus Platnick & Murphy, 1984 – Italy
Urozelotes patulusus Sankaran & Sebastian, 2018 – India
Urozelotes rusticus (L. Koch, 1872) (type) – Both Americas, Africa, Europe, Asia, Australia. Native area unknown, probably Old World.
Urozelotes trifidus Tuneva, 2003 – France, Russia (Europe)

References

Araneomorphae genera
Cosmopolitan spiders
Gnaphosidae
Taxa named by Cândido Firmino de Mello-Leitão